Luna is a popular pop group from Serbia with considerable popularity throughout the former Yugoslavia. The key group member is multi-instrumentalist and composer Čeda Čvorak (born Čedomir Rajičić). They released ten studio albums.

Luna have been recording albums since the late 1990s, and popular songs have included Drugarice (Girlfriend) with Svetlana Ražnatović (Ceca), and more recently Ne ostavljaj me (Don't leave me), featuring Gloria from Bulgaria (one of a number of songs sung in Bulgarian and Serbian). The song was originally released by Luna in 1999 and sounds like the Sisters Of Mercy's song "This Corrosion".

The first and best known lead singer was Serbian female singer Maja Marković, who stayed in the group from 1997. She left the group in 2006 and was replaced by the studied ballerina Kristina Čanković, who was the lead singer from 2007 to 2009. Notable songs sung by Kristina had been Ulica uzdaha and Jako, Jako released in late 2007. Ulica uzdaha was a duet with distinguished Bosnian singer Halid Bešlić.

In 2009 the new female vocalists Zejna Murkić and Lidija Jadžić joined the group and released two albums together. In 2010 Čeda Čvokak announced that he would stop working with Zejna Murkić and would work only with Lidija Jadžić in the future. Shortly after this statement Ivana Krunić joined the group.

They are signed with the record label City Records.

Released Albums
Samo svoja (1998)
Ti i ja možemo sve (1999)
Godine lete ... godine lude (2001)
I u dobru i u zlu (2002)
Milion dolara (2004)
Bez maske do daske (2005)
Ulica uzdaha (2007)
Da san ne prestane (2009)
Sex On The Beach (2010) 
Luna 10 (2012)
011     (2014)
Zodijak (2017)
Karma (2019)
The albums from 1998 to 2005 where recorded with Maja Marković, the album from 2007 with Kristina Čanković and the two from 2009 to 2010 with Zejna Murkić and Lidija Jadžić.

Members
Čeda Čvorak - songwriter
Maja Marković - vocals (1996–2006)
Šarvari Saša - drummer (2001-2006)
Jelena Kovačević - vocals (2006–2007)*
Kristina Čanković - vocals (2007–2009)
Zеjna Murkić and Lidija Jadžić - vocals (2009–2010)
Ivana Krunić and Lidija Jadžić - vocals (2010 - 2017)
Teodora Mijuskovic (2017 - now)

References

External links
 www.grupaluna.net (in Serbian)
 

Serbian pop music groups
Serbian pop-folk music groups
Hayat Production artists
Beovizija contestants